The City 6 is an informal association of college athletic programs in the Philadelphia area. It is an intra-city intramural competition, but it is also used as a colloquial term to describe all the Division-I schools in the Philadelphia area.

The colleges in the City 6 are all of the Philadelphia Big 5 schools—La Salle University, Saint Joseph's University (SJU), Temple University, the University of Pennsylvania, and Villanova University—along with Drexel University.

The City 6 Extramural Classic features the best intramural teams from each school competing against one another. The classic was founded in 1986 by representatives from Saint Joseph's and Temple. Games between the intramural programs are held at such locations as SJU's Hagan Arena, Penn's Franklin Field, and Villanova Stadium.

The sports are flag football, volleyball, basketball, and softball. Each sport includes competition for men, women, and co-ed.

Over 13,000 intramural participants have competed in City 6 events over the last twenty years.

Varsity basketball
Each spring, the basketball coaches of the six schools sit together and are speakers at the Coaches vs. Cancer Tourney Tip-Off Breakfast, to raise money for the American Cancer Society.

Institutions

References

Basketball in Philadelphia
Drexel Dragons
Drexel Dragons men's basketball
La Salle Explorers
La Salle Explorers men's basketball
Penn Quakers
Penn Quakers men's basketball
Saint Joseph's Hawks
Saint Joseph's Hawks men's basketball
Temple Owls
Temple Owls men's basketball
Villanova Wildcats
Villanova Wildcats men's basketball
College basketball rivalries in the United States
History of college basketball in the United States